Casale di Scodosia is a comune (municipality) in the Province of Padua in the Italian region Veneto, located about  southwest of Venice and about  southwest of Padua.  
 
Casale di Scodosia borders the following municipalities: Megliadino San Fidenzio, Megliadino San Vitale, Merlara, Montagnana, Piacenza d'Adige, Urbana.

References

External links 
Official website

Cities and towns in Veneto